Keele University, officially known as the University of Keele, is a public research university in Keele, approximately  from Newcastle-under-Lyme, Staffordshire, England. Founded in 1949 as the University College of North Staffordshire, Keele was granted university status by Royal Charter in 1962.

Keele occupies a  rural campus close to the village of Keele and consists of extensive woods, lakes and Keele Hall set in Staffordshire Potteries. It has a science park and a conference centre, making it the largest campus university in the UK. The university's School of Medicine operates the clinical part of its courses from a separate campus at the Royal Stoke University Hospital. The School of Nursing and Midwifery is based at the nearby Clinical Education Centre.

History

Establishment
Cambridge and Oxford Extension Lectures had been arranged in the Potteries since the 1890s, but outside any organised educational framework or establishment. In 1904, funds were raised by local industrialists to support teaching by the creation of a North Staffordshire College, but the project, without the backing of Staffordshire County Council, was abandoned.

By the late 1930s the Staffordshire towns of Longton, Fenton, Burslem, Hanley had grown into the largest conurbation without some form of university provision. A large area including Staffordshire, Shropshire and parts of Cheshire and Derbyshire did not have its own university. Stoke, in particular, demanded highly qualified graduates for the regional pottery and mining industries and also additional social workers, teachers and administrators. A. D. Lindsay, Professor of Philosophy and Master of Balliol College, Oxford, was a strong advocate of working-class adult education, and suggested a "people's university" in an address to the North Staffordshire Workers' Educational Association in 1925.

Curricular philosophy

Recently appointed to the House of Lords, Lindsay participated in producing the influential Foreign Office report University Reform in Germany, which argued that no institution deserved the name of "university" unless it combined teaching and research. Consistent with his democratic ideals of education, Lindsay also warned of the dangers of training the specialist intellect in the natural sciences and the need to introduce elements of social sciences at university level by broadening the academic agenda. Lindsay believed technological excesses sponsored by the state without a review of the social and political consequences had been a major contributor to Germany's downfall. This was to heavily influence Keele's curriculum. On 13 March 1946, Lindsay wrote to Sir Walter Moberly, chair of the University Grants Committee (UGC), suggesting the creation of a college "on new lines". The committee wanted a university for the 20th century that could overcome the division between arts and sciences, and what Moberly was calling the "evil of departmentalism". The UGC argued that "The tasks of the modern citizen and the study of modern society should be central to the curriculum." North Staffordshire was seen as an ideal site since it "presented many typical problems thrown up by modern industrial conglomerations, such as those posed by technical innovation in the pottery and mining industries." The college could become a "social laboratory" for industries and the local communities they catered for.

Normal practice was for new colleges (such as Southampton, Exeter and Nottingham) to be launched without degree-awarding powers. Students would instead matriculate with and take external degrees from the University of London. Lindsay wanted to "get rid of the London external degree" and instead found a college with degree-awarding authority, as well as the power to set its own syllabus, perhaps acting under the sponsorship of an established university. This would allow the college to start afresh in the setting of its curriculum. Lindsay wrote to the Vice-Chancellor of the University of Oxford, tentatively requesting such sponsorship.

An exploratory committee was established by Stoke-on-Trent City Council, and, having secured public funding from the UGC in January 1948, the committee acquired Keele Hall on the outskirts of Newcastle-under-Lyme from its owner, Ralph Sneyd. The Hall was purchased together with the bulk of the Sneyd estate and a number of prefabricated structures erected by the Army during the Second World War for £31,000.

In August 1949 the university college was granted the right to award its own degrees. The first graduate was George Eason, who had studied mathematics at Birmingham University and gained a BSc in 1951. He received his MSc in 1952 from Keele. In 1954 the first graduate studying fully at Keele was Margaret Boulds, who received a dual honours degree in philosophy and English.

Receiving university status

Growing steadily to 1,200 students, the university college was granted university status in 1962, receiving a new royal charter in January that year, and adopting the name "University of Keele". Alternatives were considered, including "The University of Stoke" or "Stoke-on-Trent", but both were rejected because the estate is situated in the borough of Newcastle-under-Lyme. "Staffordshire University" was also discussed (this is now the name of the former North Staffordshire Polytechnic). The university is a short distance west of the civil parish of Keele, and it was decided to name it after the village. It is the only establishment of higher education in the UK to be named after a village, and this has long attracted questions as to its location. Together with Reading, Nottingham, Southampton, Hull, Exeter and Leicester, all university colleges founded a short time before or after the First World War, Keele was identified as one of the "younger civic universities" by the Robbins Report.

In 1968 the Royal Commission on Medical Education (1965–68) issued the Todd Report, which examined the possibility of a medical school being established at Keele. It was considered that North Staffordshire would be a good site, having a large local population and several hospitals. However, a minimum intake of 150 students each year would be necessary to make a medical school economically and educationally viable, and the university was at that time too small to support a medical school of this size.

Keele's International Relations Department was founded in 1974 by Alan James and was one of the first institutions to offer a full degree in the subject. The Keele World Affairs Group, closely associated, followed suit in 1980. Keele's first female professor was appointed to the Chair of Social Work in 1976. In 1978, Keele Department of Postgraduate Medicine was created, although it did not cater for undergraduate medical students.

Government funding cuts

In late 1985, after a series of cuts in university funding, Keele briefly considered merging with North Staffordshire Polytechnic, but negotiations collapsed. In September 1983, the Secretary of State, via the UGC, had encouraged the idea, asserting that the most radical way of increasing the size of departments and diminishing their number is by the merger of institutions. At the time, Keele had a population of 2,700 students, compared to 6,000 at the less academically exclusive Polytechnic. Edwina Currie, then Conservative MP for South Derbyshire, remarked, "A university which is now below 3,000 students has got problems. It simply isn't big enough". Keele University Science & Business Park Ltd (KUSP Ltd) opened in 1987, partly to generate and diversify alternative sources of income.

In 1994, the Oswestry and North Staffordshire School of Physiotherapy (ONSSP), which had been a separate institution based at the Robert Jones and Agnes Hunt Orthopaedic Hospital in Oswestry, Shropshire, merged with Keele University, becoming Keele's Department of Physiotherapy Studies (now School of Health & Rehabilitation). It moved to the Keele University campus. In August 1995, Keele University merged with North Staffordshire College of Nursing and Midwifery, forming the new School of Nursing and Midwifery. In 1998 and 1999 there was some controversy when the university decided to sell the Turner Collection, a valuable collection of printed mathematical books, including some which had belonged to and had been heavily annotated by Isaac Newton, in order to fund major improvements to the university library. Senior university officials authorised the sale of the collection to a private buyer, with no guarantee that it would remain intact or within the UK. Although the sale was legal, it was unpopular among the academic community, and the controversy was fuelled by prolonged negative press coverage suggesting that the £1m sale price was too low and that the collection was certain to be broken up.

21st century developments

New Schools of Medicine, Pharmacy, Nursing and Midwifery
Sir David Weatherall was named as Chancellor in 2000. In 2001, Keele was awarded an undergraduate medical school in partnership with Manchester University. Initially, some students from Manchester Medical School began being taught at Keele. Finally Keele's own medical school opened in 2007 with the first of cohort of students graduating in 2012. In 2009, the university was awarded a Queen's Anniversary Prize for Higher and Further Education, for 'pioneering work with the NHS in early intervention and primary care in the treatment of chronic pain and arthritis, linking research to delivery to patients through GP networks and user groups'. In 2006 the School of Pharmacy was created with the launch of MPharm degree programmes.

In early 2001, to cut costs, the faculties of Humanities and Social Sciences merged. Due to declining popularity and funding, the German department closed in December 2004 with the university retaining its physics degree despite the subject facing similar pressures. Although degrees ceased to be offered in modern languages, a Language Learning Unit was created to provide Arabic, Mandarin Chinese, French, German, Japanese, Russian and Spanish teaching for Keele students and staff. This can lead to an enhanced degree title given sufficient electives taken.

The foundation year was eliminated in 1998 but re-introduced in 2012 with new programmes of study, the international foundation year and the accelerated international foundation year which add to the existing offer, as well as the humanities, science, social science, health, general foundation years and foundation year for people who are visually impaired.

Environmental agenda and energy projects
Starting in 2012, Keele has placed environmental sustainability at the heart of its strategy. In 2016, Keele was finalist in the Green Gowns Awards for its "significant reduction in carbon emissions and to a dedicated programme of carbon reduction projects supported by an excellent energy management system". In the People & Planet Green League 2015 assessments for environmental and ethical performance, Keele ranked 48 of 151 educational establishments. The creation of a SMART energy centre due for completion in 2021 will allow the campus to become energy self-sufficient via waste recycling and alternative energy sources.

Business School relocation and STEM expansion
In 2017, Keele School of Management (KMS), which was at the time housed in the Darwin Building, decided to expand its offering at undergraduate level with new single honours programmes. The new science park Mercia Centre for Innovation and Leadership (MCIL) initiative, due for completion in 2019 serve as a relocation for the school. KMS also elected to work more closely with regional business actors e.g. Michelin Tyre PLC in Stoke-on-Trent by offering first year students the opportunity to work on live projects. Additionally, Keele has embarked on a major expansion of STEM subjects with a £45m investment.

Veterinary School with Harper Adams University
The university is in advanced discussions with Shropshire's Harper Adams University for the creation of a joint Veterinary School on-campus with its first student intake expected in 2019. The development will comprise a veterinary hospital, a clinical skills centre, and the Keele campus-based Veterinary School hub facilities. Developed by CVS on the Keele University Science and Innovation Park, the facilities will be ready for the first student intake in autumn 2020.

Symbols

Heraldry
The heraldic grant of arms features the scythe of the Sneyd family, who owned the Keele park estate from 1540 to 1949, and includes the Sneyd family's motto "Thanke God for All". The shield features the colours red and yellow to represent the County of Staffordshire as well as the Staffordshire chevron. The Stafford knot for Stafford, the Fleur-de-Lys for Burton upon Trent and the Fret depict the historical association with the industry of Stoke-on-Trent. An open book joins Rodin's Le Penseur, which is represented amid a wreath of laurel vert. Variations on this have appeared in various corporate logos and shield but this remains the formal grant of arms in official documents.

Corporate Logo

Prior to 1986, the university shield was principally utilized on marketing (e.g. university prospectus) and communications material (corporate letterheads etc.). With the opening of the Science park, brand identity evolved with a new, modern corporate wordmarque featuring 'Congress' and 'Proteus' typefaces. In 1995, the corporate logo changed again with an intertwined ribbon motif representing the overlapping of educational disciplines.  In 2011, the university shield returned relying heavily on the armorial bearings but with a modern twist for the digital age.

Academic dress
The academic gowns reflect the colours of the County of Staffordshire and emphasise red and yellow. Higher Doctorates utilise purple, whilst the College of Fellows uses red and gold.

Campus

Setting

Located in North Staffordshire, Keele's campus is rural with many 19th-century architectural features such as Keele Hall predating the concrete and red-brick buildings of the modern university. The campus occupies a  rural campus close to the village of Keele and consists of extensive woods, lakes and Keele Hall set in Staffordshire Potteries. The estate was originally given by King Henry II of England to the Knights Templars in 1180. When the Templars were condemned and dissolved by the Council of Vienne in 1311, their possessions were annexed by the Knights Hospitallers until their dissolution by Henry VIII. The estate was purchased from the Crown by the Sneyd family and remained their property until acquisition by the Stoke-on-Trent Corporation in 1948. Apart from increasing numbers of academic and residential buildings, other facilities include an astronomical observatory, arts and cultural programme, arboretum, Islamic centre, shops, cafés and places to eat and drink. The campus has science, business enterprise parks and conference centres. It is home to the Earth Science Education Unit (ESEU). The chapel is located in the centre of the campus, close to the university library and student union. From the onset, Christian worship was central to university life. Lindsay, first principal of the University College, was an ardent Christian preaching every Sunday in the Library Reading room of Keele Hall. A permanent structure was required and the chapel was built in 1965. Built from Staffordshire blue brick, the chapel accommodates different Christian traditions.

Halls of residence
There are five halls of residence on the main campus: Horwood, Lindsay, Barnes, Holly Cross and The Oaks. (Hawthorns Hall was located off site in Keele village just outside the main entrance. However, the site has been sold for redevelopment, and the halls demolished.) These halls provide accommodation for 70% of all full-time students. Three of the oldest halls, Horwood (1957), Lindsay (1964) and Barnes (1970) are named after the founding fathers of the university. The Oaks (1992), west of Lindsay Hall, is named after four oak trees that were felled to pave the way for the university residence and Holly Cross (1993). The Hawthorns (1957), remnants of the Sneyd property in Keele Village, was originally a large house, two paddocks and gardens totalling 13 acres.

Planned developments

Following student demand for accommodation on-campus, in 2018, Barnes hall of residence will be re-developed with new residential units added to cater for an additional 453 bedrooms, funded from the proceeds of the sale of the Hawthorns.

Science Park
The university operates a Science Park under a wholly owned subsidiary company, Keele University Science & Business Park Limited.

Library

When the university was founded in 1948, the Librarian's office was located above a public house in Stoke, near the Town Hall. In 1952, the old Sneyd Library was used with 20,000 items which increased to 70,000 by 1954. By 1955, 155,000 volumes were accounted for and necessitating 12 full-time staff. Later, the Senate Room in Keele Hall was used to house the material. Construction of the new library campus began in 1961 with additional expansion completed in 1966. By the early 1970s, the library was able to accommodate 750 readers and 600,000 books.

Material acquisition
The university purchased the collection of deceased Belgian Professor Charles Saroléa, consisting of between 150,000 and 300,000 items. A viewing was organized and an agreement reached with the trustees to the acquisition of 120,000 books at a cost of £1348. However, the books were stocked in Edinburgh and removing the items without delay was one of the conditions of the agreement. A price per ton was fixed and the books arrived, first in a Methodist church school where each item was sorted and cataloged. The books were transferred to the new campus building in 1961.

Later developments
The library catalogue and circulation system was automated in 1990. In 1993, the Computer Centre merged with the library, renamed Keele Information Services (KIS). The library allowed for new PC labs and an IT Helpdesk to assist students. With further modernisation in 2006, a self-service digitised counter was opened and refurbishment of different library wings. In 2005, following students' requests, a group study area was incorporated in the Short-Loan library. The library is now opened 24/7 during each semester.

Health Library
Since the founding of the Keele University School of Medicine, a Health Library is available to both Keele students and National Health Service (NHS) staff at the Royal Stoke University Hospital. An IT suite complements the material with 60 workstations.

Organisation and administration

Liberal arts college ethos

The university's curriculum required every student to study two principal subjects to honours level, as well as further subsidiary subjects, with an additional requirement that students should study at least one subject from each of the subject groupings of Arts, Sciences and Social Sciences. The cross-disciplinary requirement was reinforced by the Foundation Year, an innovation which meant that for the first year of the four-year programmes, all students would study a common course of interdisciplinary "foundation studies". This key particularity of the Keele curriculum led Michael Brawne to remark in 1966 that the university was "the nearest thing in Britain to the small liberal arts college in the US".

Standard three-year degrees were introduced in 1973 and the numbers of students following the Foundation Year course have steadily dwindled since. The Foundation Year has never been formally discontinued, however, and remains an option for prospective students who qualify for entry into higher education, but lack subject-specific qualifications for specific degree programmes. By contrast, almost 90 per cent of current undergraduates read dual honours. Able to combine any two available subjects, students have a choice of over 500 degree courses in all. The university also offers a study abroad semester to most of its students.

As an experimental community, Keele was initially founded as a "wholly residential" institution. Of the initial intake of 159 students in October 1950, 149 were resident on campus, and it was required of the first professors appointed that they should also be in residence. With the expansion of the university, total residency has long since been abandoned, but the proportion of full-time students resident on campus remains above average at 62% in 2011.

Faculties, departments and schools 
Keele's academic activities are organised into the following three faculties and schools:

All Keele's courses, with the exception of Medicine and Pharmacy, are modular, with the academic year divided into two semesters, with breaks at Christmas and Easter. There are approximately 14 students to every member of staff.

Governance
The statutes of the university are laid out in its Royal Charter granted in 1962. These describe the organisational structure and powers that allow the university to function and govern its affairs. The Chancellor is appointed by an elected council every 5 years or until resignation and supplemented by a Pro-Chancellor and Deputy Pro-Chancellors. The Vice-Chancellor, also appointed by the council, requires approval from the senate and is the principal academic and administrative officer of the university. All are officers of the university.

University partnerships & overseas exchange programmes

The university operates several collaborative arrangements with educational establishments in the UK and abroad. In 2016, in the UK and regionally, Keele held joint contracts/awards with Liverpool University (Marie Curie Palliative Care Institution), University of Salford and Staffordshire University. Keele also has multiple franchise agreements, represented in South East Asia with SEGo College, KDU University College and the Sri Lankan Institute of Information Technology. Early overseas exchange programmes in the 1950s debuted in the US with Swarthmore College, Pennsylvania and Reed College, Oregon whilst, in continental Europe, with Université de Nancy. Today, Keele has exchange agreements with over 80 academic institutions worldwide.

Finance
According to the university's Statement of Accounts for 2015/16, total income for the year ending 31 July 2016 was just over £148.5 million with a total expenditure of £140.5 million. This amounted to a consolidated surplus of £8 million and a slight increase of £3.6 million on a yearly basis. For 2015/16, income was primarily derived from academic fees raking £71.3 million with home and European Union students the largest group accounting for £50.3 million followed by international students with £13.6 million. Tuition fees and education contracts account for 48% of total income received before donations and endowments. The university has continued to invest in capital projects with the refurbishments of the Walter Moberley and Huxley buildings, an upgrade to the Sports Centre facilities and a new HR/payroll system.

Keele College of Fellows
In 2011, Keele established a college of fellows to promote the activities of the university outside the traditional realm of academia. Current members includes alumni who have demarcated themselves in the field of industry, media and/or public service as well as key stakeholders from in and around Staffordshire.

Academic profile and reputation

Keele has a graduation rate of over 90%, with 68.4% achieving 1sts or 2:1s. 90% of undergraduates are state-educated, and over 25% of students are from working-class backgrounds. In recent years Keele has attempted to boost this number by reaching out to local schools and hosting a summer school. In February 2011, a Sutton Trust report revealed that 3·4% of students had received free school meals, whilst 7·9% had attended private schools. This compares the national figures for England of 14% eligible for free school meals, and 7% independently educated.

Admissions
New students entering Keele in 2016 had an average of 128 UCAS points or ABB at A'Level. Typically three-year degree courses ask for A'Level grades (or equivalent) of between AAB and BBC with the exception of Medicine. Keele has made it a priority to attract applicants with ABB grades and above at A'Level. The university also aspires to enter the top 30 across league tables by 2020. In May 2012 Keele was listed by the Times Higher Education (THE) magazine as among the world's top 100 new (50 years old or less) universities. In September 2016, Keele was awarded 'University of the Year for Student Experience' (The Times and The Sunday Times annual University of the Year awards, 2017).

UCAS clearing
Keele has traditionally participated in the UCAS clearing process and it has become customary for the university to lower its requirements to fill outstanding places. In September 2018, the university reduced its academic demands to 72 UCAS points or higher equivalent to 2 A'Levels at grades B and C in dual and single honours degree programmes with vacancies remaining.

Teaching
According to the National Student Survey (NSS) and excluding private or specialist institutions, the university ranked first for Student Satisfaction in 2014, 2015 and 2016 (jointly with the University of St Andrews) amongst broad-based educational establishments. The NSS is aimed at final year undergraduates, gathering opinions about their experience of their courses and the institution. It is conducted independently and a key quality indicator of higher education in the UK. In 2015, disciplines that scored highest included Education, Geology, Medicine, Pharmacy, Nursing, Physiotherapy, Biochemistry, English and Mathematics. In June 2017, Keele was awarded Gold in the Teaching Excellence Framework (TEF) which measures excellence in three areas: teaching quality, the learning environment and the educational and professional outcomes achieved by students.

Research
Keele submitted 60% of its staff to the 2014 Research Assessment Exercise (RAE) and ranked 57 of 128 institutions by grade point average (GPA) The university scored particularly well in public health, health services and primary care. Medical research includes detecting Parkinson's disease early, and using stem cell research to aid the healing process. The cochlear implant was developed in the Department of Communication and Neuroscience at Keele. Other notable medical pursuits includes attempts to explain the evolution of the human brain, looking into links between cannabis and mental illness (cited in the 2009 reclassification debate), as well as tumour and cancer research. In August 2009, university astronomers, led by David Anderson, discovered the first planet that orbits in the opposite direction to the spin of its star. The planet was named WASP-17b. In 2010 Richard Stephens, John Atkins, and Andrew Kingston won the Ig Nobel prize for confirming the widely held belief that swearing relieves pain. In 2010 a medical centre in Newport, Shropshire was completed, for students to learn in real medical situations and to research medical sciences.

Student life

Students' Union
Keele University Students' Union organises social activities throughout the year. The principal Students' Union building was designed by Stillman & Eastwick-Field (now part of the T. P. Bennett practice), with some guidance from the university's architect, J. A. Pickavance. It opened in 1962 and was completed in 1963, extended in the 1970s and the ground-floor interior remodelled in 2011–2012. Its magazine, Concourse, was founded in 1964 and is issued monthly during term time. It is editorially independent of both the university and the students' union.

Student activity
The Keele team won the 1968 series of University Challenge. The same team also made runner up to Sidney Sussex College, Cambridge (1979) in the 2002 special University Challenge: Reunited.

Student radio
There is a student radio station called KUBE Radio (Keele University Broadcasting Enterprises) with broadcast over the Internet.

Student sports
Keele sports range from rugby to lacrosse and dodgeball. Sports teams and issues raised are managed by the Athletic Union. The centre has two national standard sports halls, a single court gymnasium, a fitness centre, dance studio and climbing wall. Outside there is an all weather floodlit AstroTurf pitch, tennis courts and extensive playing fields. It is also the first university centre in the UK to offer a full "Kinesis" gym facility.

Keele University Sports Centre hosts the matches of Newcastle (Staffs) Volleyball Club, providing around 110 tiered seats with the perfect view of some of the best matches in English Volleyball. In 2012, Keele University took part in the first official inter-university Muggle Quidditch match, winning and thus becoming the top ranked team in the country. The sport has since expanded and Keele has remained one of the forerunners, finishing in second place at the British Quidditch Cup in November 2013. The university also hosted eight teams for the Northern Cup in March 2014.

Varsity
Keele University's Athletic Union plays an annual multi-sports series against the neighbouring Staffordshire University. The event was founded as a charity football match in 2001. Since 2007, Keele University's Athletic Union has played an annual multi-sports varsity series against local rivals Staffordshire University. The varsity match occurs at both universities sports facilities, alternating between the venues each year. Sports included in the contest include football, cricket, rugby, badminton, lacrosse, swimming, volleyball, netball, hockey, fencing, tennis, basketball and frisbee. Team Keele and Team Staffs went head to head across a record 23 sports in 2017. Keele has won the varsity trophy in 2008, 2010, 2011, 2012, 2013, 2014, 2015, 2016, 2017, 2018, 2019 & 2022. Staffordshire University won in 2007 and 2009.

Notable people

In popular culture
Keele University featured prominently in Marvellous, the biographical film about honorary graduate Neil Baldwin broadcast on BBC Two in September 2014. The BBC filmed parts of its surreal comedy A Very Peculiar Practice (1986–1988) at the Keele University campus and students played extra parts.

References

Bibliography

Whyte, William (16 March 2015), Redbrick: A Social and Architectural History of Britain's Civic Universities. Oxford University Press.

External links
 Keele University
Keele University Science and Business Park
Keele University Students Union

 
1949 establishments in England
Educational institutions established in 1949
Keele University
Universities UK
Student radio in the United Kingdom